Jean Foussat (Brive-la-Gaillarde, 14 December 1931- Brive-la-Gaillarde, 3 March 2015), was a former French rugby league footballer who played as centre or wing.

Biography 
During his entire career, Foussat played for Villeneuve-sur-Lot, which he won a French Championship title in 1959. Thanks to his club performances, he represented France at the 1957 Rugby League World Cup.

Personal life
Outside the pitch, he worked as an electrician.

Honours 
 Team :
 French Champion : in 1959 (Villeneuve-sur-Lot).

References

External links 
  Jean Foussat profile at rugbyleagueproject.com

French rugby league players
Villeneuve Leopards players
Sportspeople from Corrèze
Rugby league wingers
Rugby league centres
1931 births
2015 deaths
People from Brive-la-Gaillarde
France national rugby league team players